Long Creek Township may refer to the following townships in the United States:

 Long Creek Township, Boone County, Arkansas
 Long Creek Township, Carroll County, Arkansas
 Long Creek Township, Searcy County, Arkansas
 Long Creek Township, Macon County, Illinois
 Long Creek Township, Decatur County, Iowa